Ezra A. Burrell (November 3, 1867 – June 5, 1930) was a Republican politician from Idaho. He served as the tenth lieutenant governor of Idaho from 1907 to 1909 during the administration of Governor Frank R. Gooding. He was a native of Illinois. Burrell died in 1930 and is buried at Forest Lawn Memorial Park in Los Angeles, California, where he moved in 1918.

References

People from Bear Lake County, Idaho
Idaho Republicans
Lieutenant Governors of Idaho
1867 births
People from Carmi, Illinois
1930 deaths